Metalopex is an extinct hypocarnivorous canid mammal similar to Vulpes endemic to Late Miocene North America. Its sister taxon is the extant Urocyon; together, the two genera form a clade based on dentition. These same dental characteristics are shared by Otocyon and Protocyon.

References

Vulpini
Miocene mammals of North America
Prehistoric canids
Taxa named by Richard H. Tedford
Prehistoric carnivoran genera